The 1955 Hawaii R6D-1 crash was an accident involving a Douglas R6D-1 Liftmaster of the United States Navy which crashed into a mountain peak in Hawaii on 22 March 1955, killing all 66 people on board. At the time, it was the worst crash involving any variant of the Douglas DC-6 airliner the second-worst aviation accident in U.S. history, and one of the worst air accidents anywhere in history, and it equalled the 11 August mid-air collision of two United States Air Force C-119G Flying Boxcars over West Germany and the 6 October United Airlines Flight 409 crash as the deadliest air accident of 1955. It remains the worst air disaster in the history of Hawaii and the deadliest accident involving a heavier-than-air aircraft in the history of United States naval aviation.

Aircraft
The R6D-1 involved, Bureau Number 131612, had been manufactured in 1953 and was based at Moffett Field, California. The R6D-1 was the U.S. Navy version of the United States Air Forces C-118 Liftmaster and of the civilian Douglas DC-6B airliner.

Flight history 
The R6D-1 was carrying a U.S. Navy crew of nine and was loaded to capacity with 57 passengers on a Military Air Transport Service flight from Tokyo, Japan, to Travis Air Force Base, California, via Hickam Air Force Base, Territory of Hawaii. The passengers included 55 servicemen – 17 U.S. Air Force, 22 United States Army, 12 United States Marine Corps, and four U.S. Navy personnel – and two civilians, who were the wife and three-year-old daughter of one of the military passengers. After making its stop at Hickam, the aircraft took off at 6:06 p.m. local time on 21 March 1955 for the final leg of its flight to California. The crew began to experience radio problems, and four hours and 20 minutes after departure they decided to return to Hickam.

The R6D-1 was flying in a heavy rainstorm as it descended to land at Hickam early on 22 March 1955. Eyewitnesses reported that the pilot turned his landing lights on just before striking the mountain and, presumably seeing the mountain ahead, banked sharply to avoid it.

Witnesses reported that the fire was large enough to redden the night sky for over two hours, and remained hot enough that rescuers were unable to approach the wreckage for several hours. No survivors were found.

The accident was the first of two major air disasters involving an R6D-1 in less than 19 months, the second being the disappearance of an R6D-1 over the Atlantic Ocean in October 1956.

Investigation
Straying into the Waianae Range in darkness without realizing their error until almost the last second, the crew flew the aircraft into the peak.

See also

List of accidents and incidents involving military aircraft (1955–59)

References

Accidents and incidents involving United States Navy and Marine Corps aircraft
Aviation accidents and incidents involving controlled flight into terrain
Accidents and incidents involving the Douglas DC-6
Aviation accidents and incidents in Hawaii
Aviation accidents and incidents in the United States in 1955
Honolulu County, Hawaii
1955 in Hawaii
United States Navy in the 20th century
March 1955 events in the United States